Staphylococcus delphini is a Gram-positive, coagulase-positive member of the bacterial genus Staphylococcus consisting of single, paired, and clustered cocci. Strains of this species were originally isolated from aquarium-raised dolphins suffering from skin lesions.

History
The first strains of Staphylococcus delphini were discovered originally in 1975 when two strains were isolated from dolphins suffering from infected wounds. Based on both phenetic and genomic data, the basis of the new species Staphylococcus delphini was established (Varaldo et al., 1988). Though there are several unique properties pertaining to this particular species, Staphylococcus delphini can be distinguished primarily from other staphylococci on the basis of “coagulase, phosphatase, heat-labile deoxyribonuclease production, carbohydrate reaction pattern, bacteriolytic activity pattern, PBP profile, and a fairly high G + C content” (Varaldo et al., 1988).

Microbiology
Staphylococcus delphini is a coagulase-positive bacterial pathogen, relative to other members of the Staphylococcus intermedius group (SIG). Other members of this group include S. cornubiensis, S. intermedius sensu stricto, and S. pseudintermedius. The members of this group have a relatively narrow host range, mainly comprising animals such as horses, ferrets, mink, and others. Despite this norm, there has been reported cases of S. delphini in humans  (Magleby et al., 2019). S. delphini and other staphylococci in its group are able to become resistant to certain antimicrobial drugs. An example of this would be an isolate of S. delphini found in a horse was resistant to erythromycin while other isolates of the same genus were susceptible to all anitmicrobial drugs that were tested. Regarding the classification of this pathogen, S. delphini has been divided into two groups (A and B) with the hosts of group A typically consisting of mustelidae such as mink, ferrets, and badgers, and group B hosts remain unknown (Stull et al., 2014)

Role in Disease/Health
Until recently, there had been zero known diagnosed cases of Staphylococcus delphini infecting humans. In 2019, a case study was done on a 57-year-old woman who developed an open wound after having a partial gastrectomy. When coming back to the hospital three months post-op, she was swabbed and this culture was ultimately identified to be Staphylococcus delphini (Magleby et al., 2019). This was notable as the patient claimed to only have had contact with her cat, an organism not known to be a host of Staphylococcus delphini. The extent of how these infections might affect humans still very unknown as nothing arose from this particular case (Magleby et al., 2019). This warrants continued research into how Staphylococcus delphini might play a role in understanding and treating infectious disease going forward.

Diagnoses/Symptoms
The first reported symptom of Staphylococcus Delphini was reported in 1988 as 2 dolphins were found to have skin lesions (Varaldo et al., 1988). Many of the symptoms of S. delphini deal with changes in the skin and in the instance of an infected mustelidae, the fur or paws. A large farm of mink were found to have been infected with a bacterial cocci that expanded the small intestines of these mink when their organs were later examined. This glutinous fluid that was discovered was later identified to be a SIG member and was classified as S. delphini. The direct source of this fluid and diarrhea wasn't determined, but scientists claimed that it was a result of S. delphini in the intestines of these mink (Sledge et al., 2010). In humans, symptoms are similar as they relate to the skin. In the first reported case of S. delphini in humans, the patient reportedly developed a gastric ulcer which was later treated and tested. Upon evaluation of the bacteria that had been accumulating in the patient, examiners found a colonization of S. delphini in the patient (Magleby et al., 2019).

Treatment
While there are few treatments for Staphylococcus delphini, one that has been lightly researched is the use of Tylosin (TYL). Tylosin is an antibiotic, used in veterinary medicine, and is a feed additive that halts the reproduction of bacteria. We know that Staphylococcus delphini is typically associated with horses, pigeons, badgers, ferrets, and mink. This particular study was done on mink. While the scientists found that Tylosin tends to work on mink, there is no evidence-based treatment regimen that has been discovered quite yet for the treatment of Staphylococcus delphini. Mink, according to the research article, are currently given Tylosin daily as a means of treatment. However, it is just a small dosage of 10 mg/kg. This test was researching the effects of upping the dosage 238-fold to 2380 mg/kg a day and researching different dosages to find the best dosage to suppress the growth of Staphylococcus delphini. Ronaghinia et al. found that between 250 and 500 times the current dosage of 10 mg/kg would be necessary to fight an infection from Staphylococcus delphini (Rhonaghinia et al., 2021). Anything less and anything more would either not work or could negatively affect the animal, respectively.

Infection control
There is no set form of infection control for this bacterium. Staphylococcus delphini is spread through animal-to-animal contact and has recently been found to spread through human-to-human contact as well. However, to prevent staph infections, like MRSA, doctors recommend washing hands throughout the day, every day. This is highly recommended, especially when dealing with foods like meat, cheese, milk, and poultry. In addition to this, these bacterial infections can be spread through cooking ware, utensils, and basically any tangible surface. Therefore, the importance of hand washing and/or use of an alcohol-based hand sanitizer is critical. For the animals, there really is nothing that can be done to prevent the spread of this infection, except for isolating the infected from other animals so that they don't contract the infection.

Research
As of December 2021, there is no virus for Staphylococcus delphini, as there is not one for s. aureus either. Minimal research and tests have been conducted for vaccines against these bacterial infections. While Staphylococcus delphini is a multidrug resistant bacterium, it will require lots of research to develop a trusted vaccine.

References

Magleby, R., Bemis, D. A., Kim, D., Carroll, K. C., Castanheira, M., Kania, S. A., Jenkins, S. G., & Westblade, L. F. (2019). First reported human isolation of Staphylococcus delphini. Diagnostic Microbiology and Infectious Disease, 94(3)

Ronaghinia, A. A., Birch, J. M., Frandsen, H. L., Toutain, P.-L., Damborg, P., & Struve, T. (2021, February 27). Evaluating a tylosin dosage regimen for treatment of Staphylococcus Delphini infection in Mink (neovison vison): A pharmacokinetic-pharmacodynamic approach - veterinary research. BioMed Central. Retrieved December 6, 2021, from https://veterinaryresearch.biomedcentral.com/articles/10.1186/s13567-021-00906-0.

Stull, J. W., Slavic, D., Rousseau, J., & Weese, J. S. (2014). Staphylococcus delphini and Methicillin-resistant S. pseudintermedius in horses, Canada. Emerging Infectious Diseases, 20(3), 485.

VARALDO, P. E., KILPPER-BALZ, R., BIAVASCO, F., SATTA, G., & SCHLEIFER, K. H. (1988). Staphylococcus Delphini sp. nov., a coagulase-positive species isolated from dolphins. International Journal of Systematic Bacteriology, 38(4), 436–439. https://doi.org/10.1099/00207713-38-4-436

Further reading

External links
Type strain of Staphylococcus delphini at BacDive -  the Bacterial Diversity Metadatabase

delphini
Bacteria described in 1988